Events from the year 1828 in Sweden

Incumbents
 Monarch – Charles XIV John

Events

 - The wood trade is liberalized.  
 - Sällskapet till belöning för trotjänare is created.

Births
 20 January – Johanna Sundberg, ballerina (d. 1910)
 9 February - Carl d'Unker, painter   (died 1866) 
 2 March - Frans Hedberg, dramatist, playwright, and poet   (died 1908) 
 6 August – Lotten von Kraemer, philanthropist   (died 1912) 
 17 September - Louise Flodin, journalist   (died 1923) 
 18 December - Viktor Rydberg, writer   (died 1895)

Deaths

 26 March – Elisabeth Olin, opera primadonna   (born 1740) 
 7 April - Helena Charlotta Åkerhielm, dramatist and translator (born 1786) 
 1 July - Euphrosyne Löf, actress and courtesan (born 1772) 
 25 September – Charlotte Seuerling, concert singer, harpsichordist, composer and poet, known as "The Blind Song-Maiden" (born 1782)

References

 
Years of the 19th century in Sweden
Sweden